Keshav Sen (born 21 September 1923) is an Indian former sports shooter. He competed in the trap event at the 1960 Summer Olympics.

References

External links
 

1923 births
Possibly living people
Indian male sport shooters
Olympic shooters of India
Shooters at the 1960 Summer Olympics
People from Ratlam district